Lubomierz  is a village in the administrative district of Gmina Mszana Dolna, within Limanowa County, Lesser Poland Voivodeship, in southern Poland. The village has a population of 1,750.

Lubomierz has a municipality called Rzeki, located eastward on the road to Szczawa. The settlement was founded in the 17th century. It used to be the location of the Gorce National Park headquarters, set up at a remote hunting lodge.

References

Villages in Limanowa County